The diving competition at the 2007 World Aquatics Championships was held from March 19 to March 26.

Medal summary

Medal table
 Host nation

Men

Women

References

2007 in diving
2007 World Aquatics Championships
Diving at the World Aquatics Championships